The PUMA Phone (also Sagem Puma M1 Phone) is a mobile touchscreen phone manufactured by Sagem Wireless in 2010.

Hardware specs 
2.8 inch TFT display
240x320 pixel resolution 143ppi
88mAh Li-ion battery
Solar cell on the back
3.2MPx fix focus camera
LED Flash
UMTS, 3G
No Wi-Fi

References

External links 
 Official Homepage

Solar-powered mobile phones
Mobile phones introduced in 2010